Back to Skull is an EP released by American alternative rock group They Might Be Giants in 1994. The EP was issued contemporaneously with the band's 1994 album John Henry. Artwork for the EP was done by Mike Mills.

Track listing
All songs written by They Might Be Giants.

Snail Shell – 3:21
Ondine – 2:31
She Was a Hotel Detective – 3:21
Mrs. Train – 3:00
Snail Dust – 3:38

Notes
"She Was a Hotel Detective" is a sequel to the song of similar name from the band's debut album.
"Snail Dust" is a remix of "Snail Shell" by the Dust Brothers.

Personnel
They Might Be Giants
John Linnell – keyboards, vocals
John Flansburgh – guitar, vocals
Brian Doherty – drums
Tony Maimone – bass guitar (tracks 1, 5)
Graham Maby – bass guitar (tracks 2, 4)

Technical
Paul Fox – co-producer (tracks 1, 5)
They Might Be Giants – co-producers (tracks 1–5)
Ed Thacker – engineer (track 1), mixing (track 1)
Pat Dillett – co-producer (tracks 2–4), engineer (tracks 2–4), mixing (tracks 2–4)
The Dust Brothers – remixing (track 5), engineers (track 5)
Scott Hull – mastering
Mike Mills – art direction, design
Michael Halsband – photography

References

External links
 Back to Skull on This Might Be A Wiki

1994 EPs
They Might Be Giants EPs
Albums produced by Pat Dillett
Elektra Records EPs